Our Lady of Victory Roman Catholic Church, also known as Our Lady of Victory / St. Joseph Roman Catholic Church, is a historic Roman Catholic church located at Rochester in Monroe County, New York.  It was designed by noted Rochester architect Andrew Jackson Warner and is a French Romanesque Revival style brick cruciform plan church built in 1868.  It features two slender towers with concave roofs, a recessed entrance inside a single-story protruding section, and a semi-circular stained-glass window.

It was listed on the National Register of Historic Places in 1992.

References

External links

 Official Website of the Parish
 Parishes Online listing
Our Lady of Victory / St. Joseph Roman Catholic Church, New York Landmarks program

Churches on the National Register of Historic Places in New York (state)
Roman Catholic churches in New York (state)
Romanesque Revival architecture in New York (state)
Roman Catholic churches completed in 1868
19th-century Roman Catholic church buildings in the United States
Roman Catholic churches in Rochester, New York
National Register of Historic Places in Rochester, New York